Ted Prior may refer to:
Ted Prior (actor) (born 1959), actor, writer and producer for some television series
Ted Prior (writer), writer of Australian children's series of Grug books

See also
Edward Prior (disambiguation)